Béni Makouana (born 28 September 2002) is a Congolese professional footballer who plays as a forward for Ligue 1 club Montpellier and the Congo national team.

Club career 
During the early part of his career in his native Congo, Makouana won the 2018 Coupe du Congo with the Diables Noirs. He then went on to join Académie SOAR in Guinea in 2019. 

On 19 October 2020, he signed for Montpellier in France for a reported transfer fee of €800,000. He was handed the number 28 jersey at the club, and initially began training with the reserve side. On 8 August 2021, Makouana made his professional debut for Montpellier as he came on as a late substitute in a 3–2 Ligue 1 loss to Marseille.

International career 
Makouana made his debut for the Congo national team on 11 October 2018, coming on as a substitute in a 3–1 win over Liberia in Africa Cup of Nations qualification.

Personal life 
Béni is the grandson of former footballers Gabard and Bolida Makouana, who played for CARA Brazzaville in the 1960s and 70s.

Honours 
Diables Noirs

 Coupe du Congo: 2018

References

External links 
 
 
 

2002 births
Living people
Sportspeople from Brazzaville
Republic of the Congo footballers
Association football forwards
Ajax de Ouenzé players
JS Poto-Poto players
CSMD Diables Noirs players
CO Coyah players
Montpellier HSC players
Ligue 1 players
Championnat National 2 players
Republic of the Congo international footballers
Republic of the Congo expatriate footballers
Republic of the Congo expatriate sportspeople in France
Republic of the Congo expatriate sportspeople in Guinea
Expatriate footballers in France
Expatriate footballers in Guinea